Constructivism may refer to:

Art and architecture
 Constructivism (art), an early 20th-century artistic movement that extols art as a practice for social purposes
 Constructivist architecture, an architectural movement in Russia in the 1920s and 1930s

Education
 Constructivism (philosophy of education), a theory about the nature of learning that focuses on how humans make meaning from their experiences
 Constructivism in science education
 Constructivist teaching methods, based on constructivist learning theory

Mathematics
 Constructivism (philosophy of mathematics), a logic for founding mathematics that accepts only objects that can be effectively constructed
 Constructivist type theory

Philosophy
 Constructivism (philosophy of mathematics), a philosophical view that asserts the necessity of constructing a mathematical object to prove that it exists
 Constructivism (philosophy of science), a philosophical view maintaining that science consists of mental constructs created as the result of measuring the natural world
 Moral constructivism or ethical constructivism, the view that moral facts are constructed rather than discovered

Political and social sciences
 Constructivism (international relations), a theory that stresses the socially constructed character of international relations
Constructivism (ethnic politics), a theory that ethnic identities are not unchanging entities and that political developments can shape which identities get activated
 Constructivist institutionalism
 Social constructivism, the view that human development is socially situated and knowledge is constructed through interaction with others

Psychology
 Constructivism (psychological school), a psychological approach that assumes that human knowledge is active and constructive

See also
 Constructionism (disambiguation) 
 Constructive theology
 Constructive empiricism
 Deconstructivism, a movement of postmodern architecture from the 1980s
 Neuroconstructivism
 Transactionalism